John Louis Castellani (August 23, 1926 – May 11, 2021) was an American attorney and a former basketball coach. He coached the Minneapolis Lakers in the NBA during the 1959–1960 season, their last before relocating to Los Angeles.  Prior to his short coaching stint with the Lakers, Castellani was the head coach at Seattle University from 1956 to 1958, and took the Chieftains to the 12-team National Invitation Tournament (NIT) in his first year. With Elgin Baylor starring in his lineup, Castellani led the 1958 team to the NCAA title game in Louisville, Kentucky, but lost  to the Kentucky Wildcats, led by head coach 

Only a month after the championship game, NCAA violations came to light concerning airfare bought for recruits Ben Warley and George Finley. The result was that Castellani resigned under fire on April 21, Baylor left for the NBA, and Seattle was given a two-year postseason ban.  Castellani returned to coaching for one year as head coach for the Lakers in the 1959–60 NBA season and again coached Baylor.

After he was released by the Lakers, he attended law school at Marquette University in Milwaukee, Wisconsin. For over half a century, he practiced as an attorney in Milwaukee and was frequently seen at Milwaukee Bucks and Marquette Golden Eagles basketball games.

Castellani died of natural causes at his home in New Britain, Connecticut, on May 11, 2021, at the age of 94.

Head coaching record

College

See also
 List of NCAA Division I Men's Final Four appearances by coach

References

External links
 BasketballReference.com: John Castellani

1926 births
2021 deaths
American men's basketball coaches
Basketball coaches from Connecticut
College men's basketball head coaches in the United States
Marquette University Law School alumni
Minneapolis Lakers head coaches
Notre Dame Fighting Irish men's basketball coaches
Seattle Redhawks athletic directors
Seattle Redhawks men's basketball coaches
Sportspeople from New Britain, Connecticut
University of Notre Dame alumni